"Rêver" (English: "Dreaming") is a 1995 song recorded by French singer-songwriter Mylène Farmer. It was the fifth single from her fourth album Anamorphosée and was released on 16 November 1996. In spite of moderate sales and chart performances, the song remains one of the most known by the general public because of the subjects it deals with, namely the Holocaust and a call for tolerance.

Background, writing and release
Initially, only four singles from the studio album Anamorphosée were scheduled. However, because of the fall of Farmer during a concert in Lyon on 15 June 1996, the song "Rêver" was chosen as the fifth single to make the fans wait, since the release of the live album would be deferred.

The single was released only as CD, and there was no vinyl. On the single cover, Farmer is kneeling, completely naked while showing modesty, which seems to be paradoxal. The digipack version of the CD maxi contains a new remix of "XXL". The second track of the CD single is the live version of the song. As for the single remix ('stripped dream remix'), it was produced by Laurent Boutonnat.

Lyrics and video
"Rêver" was Farmer's first song to refer to the genocide of World War II, in the first line, through the book If This Is a Man, written by Primo Levi (the second single was "Souviens-toi du jour"). One line of the chorus, "J'irai cracher sur vos tombeaux", refers to a book by Boris Vian under the pseudonym of Vernon Sullivan. This book provoked a controversy in 1947 because of its violent and sexual content. Several lyrics are inspired by poems by French author Pierre Reverdy: e.g., words "Nous ne marcherons plus ensemble" is an exact quote of the poem "Dans le monde étranger", "Dansent les flammes, les bras se lèvent" refer to the poem "Esprit pensant" and lyrics "Le monde comme une pendule, qui s'est arrêtée" seem to be inspired by the poem "Toujours là". The song also mentions the "angels", a recurrent theme in Farmer's songs.

In this song, Farmer says she "hopes for a better world, and confesses that she was perhaps misled glorifying misery. However, (...) [for her], that hope is just an inaccessible dream". "Rêver" ends in a different way from other Farmer's songs: not with the chorus, but with the phrase "J'ai rêvé qu'on pouvait s'aimer / J'avais rêvé du mot aimer". French author Erwan Chuberre says "Rêver" is probably one of the most moving songs of Farmer's directory.

Initially, a video in a studio version was scheduled, but finally a live version was produced (in two versions). The video shows images from the 1996 concert in which Farmer is wearing a golden dress.

Live performances
A few time after the single release, Farmer performed the song in playback in one television show, Les Enfants de la guerre, on 27 November 1996, on TF1, in which she wore the same dress made by Paco Rabanne as that of 1996 concerts. The recording of the performance took place without the audience, which caused the anger of hundreds of fans who came from France and Belgium and who had waited several hours under the rain. This incident was widely reported in the press. "Rêver" was also sung in the NRJ Music Awards on 10 January 2003. These performance was carried out in live version accompanied by Yvan Cassar who played piano. It was the first time since 17 years that Farmer sang in live on television.

"Rêver" was performed during her last five tours: 1996 Tour, Mylenium Tour, Avant que l'ombre... à Bercy, Mylène Farmer en tournée and Timeless. When Farmer sang this song at these occasions, she often wore a white dress, was accompanied by Cassar on the piano and sometimes wept. No choreography was used for these performances. On the 1999 tour, Farmer wore an orange costume composed of a privateer trousers, a thick jacket and orange shoes, with high heels. On the 2013 tour, Farmer closed the show with the song.

Chart performance
The song entered the French Single Chart at number eight on 23 November 1996 and peaked at number seven the next week, thus becoming Farmer's 14th top ten hit in France. Then the single dropped and remained in the top 50 for 15 weeks. However, although sales were moderate, the single managed the album Anamorphosée to be able to reach number one for two weeks on the top album, one year and a half after its release, and was most aired on radio.

In Belgium (Wallonia), the song debuted at number 30 on the Ultratop 50 on 21 December 1996 and reached a peak of number 12, on 2 February 1997. It fell off the chart after 17 weeks, and was the 96th best-selling single of the year.

Cover versions
In 2002, Gregorian covered the song in a 5:02 new age version which features on the album Masters of Chant Chapter II.

The most notable cover was recorded with a video in 2002 by Les Enfoirés for the album 2002: Tous dans le même bateau (track 17, 4:45). Among the artists who perform "Rêver", there are Francis Cabrel, Pascal Obispo, Marc Lavoine, Patrick Bruel, Muriel Robin and Maurane. In this version, Alizée sings alone the first verses.

Prohor Shalyapin, a former contestant of Russian television reality show Star Academy covered the song in Russian-language and his version is available on his own site.

Formats and track listings
These are the formats and track listings of single releases of "Rêver":

 CD single

 CD maxi – Crystal case / CD maxi – Digipack / CD maxi – Promo

 CD single – Promo

 Digital download

 VHS – Promo

Release history

Official versions

Credits and personnel
These are the credits and the personnel as they appear on the back of the single:
 Mylène Farmer – lyrics
 Laurent Boutonnat – music
 Requiem Publishing – editions
 Polydor – recording company
 Karl Dickinson – photo
 Henry Neu – design

Charts

Weekly charts

Year-end charts

References

Notes

1990s ballads
1995 songs
1996 singles
Mylène Farmer songs
Songs with lyrics by Mylène Farmer
Songs with music by Laurent Boutonnat